Brett Graham (born 1967) is a New Zealand sculptor who creates large scale artworks and installations that explore indigenous histories, politics and philosophies.  

Snitch from 2014, in the collection of the Honolulu Museum of Art, references the Disney movie Lilo & Stitch.  It is an example of the artist's combining traditional Maori carving with contemporary themes.  

Brett Graham used recycled rubber tires and steel to make sculptures and they were called “Weapons of Mass Destruction”. Graham’s sculpture “Te Hokioi” was created because of the 2007 police raids on the Tuhoe community of Ruatoki.

Education 
Graham is a Bachelor of Fine Arts (University of Auckland, 1988), a Master of Fine Arts (University of Hawaii at Manoa, 1991) and a Doctor of Fine Arts (University of Auckland, 2005).

International exhibitions 
Graham's work was included in the following international exhibitions.
 1996 – Asia Pacific Triennial , Queensland Art Gallery
 2001 – Purangiaho Seeing Clearly, Auckland Art Gallery Toi O Tamaki
 2001 – Parihaka: The Art of Passive Resistance, City Gallery Wellington
 2006 – Biennale of Sydney
 2007 – Venice Biennale
 2010 – Biennale of Sydney
 2017 – Honolulu Biennial

Major collections and public commissions 
Graham has received a number of important commissions and his work is held in a number of international collections

 Auckland Art Gallery Toi o Tamaki
 Museum of New Zealand Te Papa Tongarewa
 Honolulu Museum of Art
 Kahukura,, Tjibaou Cultural Centre, New Caledonia
 Whaowhia, for the Auckland War Memorial Museum
 Kaiwhakatere, Parliament precinct, Wellington 
 Rawhiti, Adam Art Gallery, Victoria University
 Kowhatu Karohirohi, Victoria University Collection
 Escape, North Shore Court House

Personal life
Of Ngāti Korokī Kahukura (Maori tribe) and Pakeha (European) descent, Graham was born in Auckland, New Zealand, where he currently resides.

References

20th-century New Zealand sculptors
20th-century New Zealand male artists
New Zealand Māori carvers
Modern sculptors
Ngāti Korokī Kahukura people
University of Auckland alumni
University of Hawaiʻi at Mānoa alumni
1967 births
Living people
New Zealand contemporary artists